Padishah is a title of nobility roughly meaning 'emperor' in Persian languages, primarily used for the Sultan of the Turkish Empire.

Padshah, Padshah, Badshah or Padişah may also refer to:

Imperial/royal ruler styles
 Sultan of the Ottoman Empire, also referred to as the Padishah
 Padshah-i Hind, the main title of the 'Great Mughal', paramount ruler of Hindustan (India)
 Padishah Bahadur, meaning 'a rank above Padshah'
 Padshah-e Awadh, assumed by the former Nawabs of Awadh

Fictional rulers
 Padishah Emperor of the Known Universe, in Frank Herbert's Dune novels
 The ruler of the Empire of Kelesh in the Pathfinder Roleplaying Game

Other uses
 Padshah (Zabul), an Afghan appointed to Afghanistan's First Constitutional Loya Jirga, see Constitutional Loya Jirga
 Padishah Khatun (1256-1295), Mongol poet and empress

See also 
 Padishah Bahadur
 Badshah (disambiguation)